Cyana croceizona is a moth of the family Erebidae. It was described by George Hampson in 1914. It is found in Papua New Guinea.

References

Cyana
Moths described in 1914